Battery G, 1st Battalion Tennessee Light Artillery was an artillery battery that served in the Union Army during the American Civil War.

Service
The battalion was organized in Memphis, Nashville, and Knoxville, Tennessee, from June 13, 1863, through October 16, 1863, under the command of Lieutenant Colonel Robert Clay Crawford.

Battery G was attached to Garrison Artillery, Nashville, Tennessee.  Assigned to "Governor's Guard" in August 1864, under the overall command of Brig. Gen. Alvan Cullem Gillem.  Reported at Bull's Gap, Tennessee, August 3, 1864.

Battery G, 1st Battalion Tennessee Light Artillery presumably ceased to exist after January 26, 1865, when the battery's men were consolidated with Battery E, 1st Battalion Tennessee Light Artillery.

Commanders
 Captain Henry C. Kelly
 Lieutenant Jeremiah H. Crane

See also

 List of Tennessee Civil War units
 Tennessee in the Civil War

References
 Dyer, Frederick H.  A Compendium of the War of the Rebellion (Des Moines, IA:  Dyer Pub. Co.), 1908.
Attribution

External links
 Brief unit history, including officers' names, regimental strengths, etc.

Military units and formations established in 1863
Military units and formations disestablished in 1865
Units and formations of the Union Army from Tennessee
1865 disestablishments in Tennessee
1863 establishments in Tennessee
Artillery units and formations of the American Civil War